The IAE V2500 is a two-shaft high-bypass turbofan engine built by International Aero Engines (IAE) which powers the Airbus A320 family, the McDonnell Douglas MD-90, and the Embraer C-390 Millennium.

The engine's name is a combination of the Roman numeral V, symbolizing the five original members of the International Aero Engines consortium, which was formed in 1983 to produce the V2500 engine. The 2500 represents the  produced by the original engine model, the V2500-A1. FAA type certification for the V2500 was granted in 1988.

Development

Rolls-Royce based the 10-stage HP compressor on a scale-up of the RC34B eight-stage research unit used in the RB401-06 Demonstrator Engine, but with two additional stages added to the front and rear of the compressor spool. Pratt & Whitney developed the combustor and the 2-stage air-cooled HP turbine, while the Japanese Aero Engine Corporation provided the LP compression system. MTU Aero Engines were responsible for the 5-stage LP turbine and Fiat Avio designed the gearbox.
In 1989, its unit cost was US$ million, US$M today.

The 4,000th V2500 was delivered in August 2009 to the Brazilian flag carrier TAM and installed on the 4,000th Airbus A320 family aircraft, an A319. In early 2012, the 5,000th V2500 engine was delivered to SilkAir, and IAE achieved 100 million flying hours. Six years later, in June 2018, over 7,600 engines were delivered and the V2500 achieved 200 million flight hours on 3,100 aircraft in service.

Variants

V2500-A1
The original version, has 1 fan stage, 3 LP booster stages, 10 HPC stages, 2 HPT stages, and 5 LPT stages. This engine promised better fuel burn on the Airbus A320 than the competing CFM56-5A; however, initial reliability issues, coupled with insufficient thrust for the larger A321, prompted the development of the improved V2500-A5 variant. It first entered service with Cyprus Airways

V2500-A5
A fourth booster stage was introduced into the engine basic configuration to increase core flow. This, together with a minor fan diameter and airflow increase, helped to increase the maximum thrust to 33,000 lbf (147 kN) thrust, to meet the requirements of the larger Airbus A321. Soon, Airbus offered derated versions of the V2500-A5 on the Airbus A319 and Airbus A320, enabling the same engine hardware to be used across all Airbus A320 family aircraft, with the exception of the Airbus A318. The vast majority of V2500s are of the A5 variety.

V2500-D5
This engine retains the configuration of the V2500-A5, but is fitted with different mounting hardware and accessory gearboxes to facilitate installation on the McDonnell Douglas MD-90.

V2500-E5
This engine retains the configuration of the V2500-A5, but is fitted with different mounting hardware and accessory gearboxes to facilitate installation on the Embraer KC-390.

De-rated and increased thrust variants

A number of de-rated, Stage 4 noise compliant engines have been produced from the -A5 configuration, as well as two variants with significant increase in thrust, thus expanding the thrust range from 23,500 lbf to 33,000 lbf:
 The  thrust V2524-A5 for the Airbus A319
 The  thrust V2527-A5 for the Airbus A320
 The  thrust V2525-D5 for the McDonnell Douglas MD-90-30. Engine accessories are mounted the side instead of bottom to accommodate lateral mounting. Also has an option in the cockpit to add 3,000 pounds (13 kN) additional thrust for "hot and high" conditions
 The  thrust V2533-A5 for the Airbus A321
 The  thrust V2531-E5 for the Embraer C-390 Millennium

V2500SelectOne
On October 10, 2005, IAE announced the launch of the V2500Select—later called V2500SelectOne—with a sale to IndiGo Airlines to power 100 A320 series aircraft. The V2500SelectOne is a combination performance improvement package and aftermarket agreement. In February 2009, Pratt & Whitney upgraded the first V2500-A5 to the SelectOne Retrofit standard; the engine was owned by US Airways and had been in use since 1998.

V2500SelectTwo
On March 15, 2011, IAE announced an upgrade option of V2500 SelectOne Engines to the SelectTwo Program. It offers reduced fuel consumption due to a software-upgrade and Reduced Ground Idle (RGI), and is available since 2014 for the V2500-A5 variants.

Applications
 Airbus A320ceo family (excluding A318)
 Embraer KC-390
 McDonnell Douglas MD-90

Specifications

 Rotor speed: LP: 5,650 RPM, HP: 14,950 RPM
 Control: Dual channel FADEC

See also

Notes

References

External links

High-bypass turbofan engines
1980s turbofan engines

it:International Aero Engines#V2500